Raaffs Horse, or Raaff's Transvaal Rangers, was an irregular unit raised by Cmdt Pieter Johannes Edward Raaff with a strength of approximately 140.  The Transvaal Rangers enlisted both European and Coloured personnel in its ranks, and recruited large numbers from the Kimberley diamond fields. It served in the 4 July 1879 Battle of Ulundi - the final battle of the Anglo-Zulu War as well as the earlier battles of Hlobane and Kambula.

References

External links
http://www.ospreypublishing.com/title_detail.php/title=S4841~ser=CAM~view=extract  Zulu War - Volunteers, Irregulars and Auxiliaries
http://www.rorkesdriftvc.com/ulundi/
http://www.historyofwar.org/articles/battles_ulundi.html

Anglo-Zulu War